Ari Ben-Menahem (Schlanger) has been professor of mathematics and geophysics at the Weizmann Institute of Science since 1964 and visiting professor at MIT. He is a seismologist, author, polymath, and historian of science. He coauthored with Sarvajit Singh, "Seismic Waves and Sources: the mathematical theory of seismology", a pioneering treatise since the nascent of this discipline at the turn of the  20th century.

Ben-Menahem was born in Berlin, Germany on November 4, 1928. He received his master's degree in physics in 1954 from the Hebrew University of Jerusalem and his doctoral degree from the California Institute of Technology (CIT) in 1961. He did his post-doctoral research at CIT, where he worked with Hugo Benioff and Frank Press (1962-1965).

In his doctoral thesis he pioneered the birth of modern seismic-source elastodynamics based on his theory of wave radiation from a finite rupturing fault with subshear or supershear velocity. His theory was confirmed through the observed asymmetric radiation of long-period surface-waves from the great Chilean earthquake of May 22, 1960, where he introduced the fundamental concepts of 'Directivity' and 'Potency' from which the moment tensor is derived. Since then, rupturing fault length, rupture velocity, moment-magnitude and moment energy are routinely calculable from spectra of recorded seismic waves-forms.

In 1975, Ben-Menahem used seismic and barometric recording of the Tunguska event of June 30, 1908, to derive the height and energy of the explosion, demonstrating for the first time a feasible non-cometary mechanism of this extraterrestrial bolide encounter with earth.

Ben-Menahem is the sole author of a 6-volume, 6000 pages treatise: Historical Encyclopedia of Natural and Mathematical Sciences published in 2009 by Springer Verlag.

Selected publications
 Seismic Waves and Sources, Springer Verlag N.Y 1981, 1108 pp.
 Seismic Waves and Sources, 2nd edition, Dover Publications, NY, 2000
 Vincint Veritas – A portrait of the life and work of N.A Haskell, Am. Geoph. Union, Washington D.C 209pp, 1990

Notes

External links

Living people
Israeli physicists
Geophysicists
Hebrew University of Jerusalem alumni
California Institute of Technology alumni
Jewish physicists
1928 births
German emigrants to Mandatory Palestine
20th-century German Jews